Wohlfahrtia africana is a species of flesh fly in the family Sarcophagidae.

Range
Nigeria.

References

Sarcophagidae
Insects described in 1985